Changpu is a town of Suining County, Hunan.

Changpu may also refer to: 
 Changpu, Susong County, a town of Susong County, Anhui
 Changpu, Yuexi County, a town of Yuexi County, Anhui
 Changpu Township, a township of Xunwu County, Jiangxi